The 10th Annual GMA Dove Awards were held during the National Quartet Convention recognizing accomplishments of musicians for the year. The show was held in Nashville, Tennessee.

External links
 

GMA Dove Awards
1978 music awards
1978 in American music
1978 in Tennessee
GMA